Eholmen (English: Eider Duck Islet) is a 1.5 km long island in the divide between Bellsund and Van Keulenfjorden, on the west coast of Spitsbergen. It is the southwesternmost point of Nathorst Land.

References 
 
 Norwegian Polar Institute Place Names of Svalbard Database

Islands of Svalbard